GBA Championship Basketball: Two-on-Two is a 1986 computer basketball game for the PC, Amiga, Apple II, Apple IIGS, Amstrad CPC, Atari ST, ZX Spectrum and Commodore 64. It was developed by Dynamix and published by Activision.

Gameplay 

From a camera located flying over the center of the court the game featured a two on two basketball game, allowing one or two players.

Reception
GBA was Activision's second best-selling Commodore game as of late 1987. Computer Gaming World praised the Commodore 64 version of GBA for improving on One on One: Dr. J vs. Larry Bird by adding a full court, teammate, and league play. The Apple IIGS version of the game was reviewed in 1988 in Dragon #129 by Hartley, Patricia, and Kirk Lesser in "The Role of Computers" column. The reviewers gave the game 4 out of 5 stars. Compute! called the Apple IIGS version "a delightful game whether you're playing or just watching", praising the graphics and sound.

Reviews
Happy Computer - 1986
Génération 4 - 1987
ASM (Aktueller Software Markt) - Jun, 1986
Your Sinclair - Oct, 1987
Computer Gamer - Dec, 1986
Zzap! - Oct, 1986
Commodore Format - Jun, 1993
Crash! - Sep, 1987

References

External links
GBA Championship Basketball:Two-on-Two at thelegacy.de

1986 video games
Amiga games
Apple II games
Apple IIGS games
Amstrad CPC games
Atari ST games
Basketball video games
Commodore 64 games
DOS games
ZX Spectrum games
Video games scored by Russell Lieblich
Dynamix games
Activision games
Video games developed in the United States